Ipomopsis spicata, commonly known as the spiked ipomopsis, is a species of plant in the phlox family. It is native to the western United States, where it is widespread from the western Great Plains to the Uintah Basin, south to New Mexico and north to Montana. It is found in a variety of habitats, from dry lowlands to above the timberline.

It is a perennial that produces a cream colored flowers in the spring.

Taxonomy
This species is highly variable through its range. Due to its occupation of many ecologically distinct and geographically isolated habitats, many subspecies and variety have been named. The currently recognized infraspecific taxa are:
I. spicata ssp. capitata - endemic to the Collegiate Peaks of Colorado
I. spicata ssp. tridactyla - endemic to the Markagunt Plateau of Utah
I. spicata ssp. orchidacea	
var. cephaloidea - mountains of Montana and Wyoming
var. orchidacea - mountains of Idaho, Montana, and Wyoming
I. spicata ssp. roburthii	- endemic to the Absaroka Range of Wyoming
I. spicata ssp. spicata - widespread in the Rocky Mountains and western Great Plains

References

spicata
Flora of the Western United States
Flora without expected TNC conservation status